Jeff Davis County is a county in the U.S. state of Texas. As of the 2020 census, its population was 1,996. Its county seat is Fort Davis. The county is named for Jefferson Davis, who served as the 23rd United States Secretary of War in the 1850s, and as President of the Confederate States of America.

Jeff Davis County is recognizable for its unique shape; it is a pentagon that has no north–south nor east–west boundaries, save for a six-mile line serving as its southern boundary. It is the only county in the United States that touches a foreign country (Mexico) at a single point. Jeff Davis is one of the nine counties that compose the Trans-Pecos region of West Texas.

The county contains the  Texas Davis Mountains American Viticultural Area. About  are "under vine". The McDonald Observatory, owned by the University of Texas at Austin, is located near Fort Davis.

History

Native Americans

Prehistoric peoples camped at Phantom Lake Spring, in present-day northeastern Jeff Davis County, and may have used the springs for irrigation. Indian pictographs in the Painted Comanche Camp of Limpia Canyon were discovered by the Whiting and Smith Expedition of 1849.

As white migrants moved into the area, tensions with Native Americans increased. The groups competed for resources, and armed conflicts were conducted for more than two decades, especially after the Civil War. In August 1861, Mescalero Apache under Chief Nicolas attacked Fort Davis, driving off livestock and killing three people. In the ensuing chase by the cavalry, Nicolas ambushed the soldiers, killing them all.

In September 1868 at Horsehead Hills, a group of volunteer Mexican and buffalo soldiers from Fort Davis attacked and destroyed a Mescalero village to recover captives and stolen livestock. In January 1870, a group of soldiers attacked a Mescalero Apache village near Delaware Creek in the Guadalupe Mountains.  In July 1880, soldiers at Tinaja de las Palmas attacked a group of Mescaleros led by Chief Victorio. In August 1880, buffalo soldiers ambushed Victorio at Rattlesnake Springs. Victorio retreated to Mexico, where he was killed in October of that year by Mexican soldiers. The last Indian depredation in the area was at Barry Scobee Mountain in 1881.

Early days

In March 1849, Lieutenants William H. C. Whiting and William F. Smith were sent out by Maj. Gen. William J. Worth of the Texas 8th Military Department to look for a route from San Antonio to El Paso del Norte. A second party, led by Dr. John S. Ford and financed by a group of Austin merchants, pioneered a trail that ran north of the Davis Mountains before turning southward toward El Paso. In June 1849 Lt. Col. Joseph E. Johnston, attached to Bvt. Maj. Jefferson Van Horne's battalion, was sent for additional surveying.

At El Paso, Horne established Fort Bliss. Texas Ranger Big Foot Wallace escorted the San Antonio-El Paso Mail coach through the mountains. Fort Davis was established in 1854. The land was leased from surveyor John James at $300 a year. The federal government surrendered the fort to the Confederacy in 1861. The CSA abandoned it in 1862 after their defeat at Glorieta Pass, New Mexico. The facility was reoccupied by U.S. troops on July 1, 1867, as a base for actions against Native American forces.

County establishment and growth

The Texas Legislature established Jeff Davis County on March 15, 1887. Fort Davis was named as the county seat. Cattle ranchers began operating in the county in the 1880s. The towns of Valentine and Chispa became supply centers for the ranchers and were later designated as railroad stops as railway construction entered the area.

Fort Davis has always been the county's largest town. By 1970, Madera Springs was known as the smallest town in Texas. Davis Mountains State Park opened to the public in the 1930s, improved during the Great Depression.

Fort Davis National Historic Site was established in 1961.  The Chihuahuan Desert Research Institute arboretum was established in 1974.

Geography
The county is home to the Davis Mountains, the highest mountain range located entirely within Texas.

Protected areas

The county has parks and preserves maintained by federal and state park services, in addition to the Chihuahuan Desert Research Institute and the Nature Conservancy of Texas. In addition to the properties listed below, the Nature Conservancy has been instrumental in the creation of conservation easements protecting an additional  of private property surrounding its preserve.

Major highways
  Interstate 10
  U.S. Highway 90
  State Highway 17
  State Highway 118
  State Highway 166

Adjacent counties and municipalities
 Reeves County (north)
 Pecos County (north)
 Brewster County (southeast)
 Presidio County (south)
 Guadalupe, Chihuahua, Mexico (west)
 Hudspeth County (northwest)
 Culberson County (north)

Climate

Jeff Davis County predominantly experiences a semiarid steppe climate with 83.0% of the county classified as cold semiarid (Köppen BSk) and 0.4% classified as hot semiarid (Köppen BSh). An additional 16.5% is classified as having a hot arid desert climate (Köppen BWh). Within the county, precipitation increases while daytime and nighttime temperatures generally become milder with increasing elevation. Rainfall is most abundant from May through October. Snowfall is also more abundant at higher elevations despite having higher wintertime average low temperatures.

Fort Davis

 Coordinates: 
 Elevation: 

McDonald Observatory

 Coordinates: 
 Elevation: 

Valentine

 Coordinates: 
 Elevation:

Demographics
As of 2021, Jeff Davis County, with a median age of 60, is one of six counties in the United States with a median age greater than or equal to 60.

Note: the US Census treats Hispanic/Latino as an ethnic category. This table excludes Latinos from the racial categories and assigns them to a separate category. Hispanics/Latinos can be of any race.

As of the 2010 United States Census,  2,342 people were living in the county; 90.2% were White, 1.0% African American, 0.6% Native American, 0.3% Asian, 5.8% of some other race, and 2.0% of two or more races. About 33.7% were Hispanic or Latino (of any race).

As of the census of 2000,  2,207 people, 896 households, and 632 families were living in the county. The population density was less than 1/km2 (1/sq mi). The 1,420 housing units averaged less than 1/km2 (1/sq mi). The racial makeup of the county was 90.53%  White, 0.91% African American, 0.32% Native American, 0.09% Asian, 5.17% from other races, and 2.99% from two or more races. About 35.48% of the population were Hispanic or Latino of any race.

Of the 896 households,  27.30% had children under the age of 18 living with them, 60.80% were married couples living together, 6.90% had a female householder with no husband present, and 29.40% were not families. About 26.30% of all households were made up of individuals, and 10.30% had someone living alone who was 65 older. The average household size was 2.39, and the average family size was 2.88.

In the county, the age distribution was 24.40% under 18, 5.30% from 18 to 24, 24.10% from 25 to 44, 30.00% from 45 to 64, and 16.30% who were 65 or older. The median age was 42 years. For every 100 females, there were 104.50 males. For every 100 females age 18 and over, there were 104.40 males.

The median income for a household in the county was $32,212, and for a family was $39,083. Males had a median income of $27,011 versus $21,384 for females. The per capita income for the county was $18,846. About 14.10% of families and 15.00% of the population were below the poverty line, including 17.10% of those under age 18 and 19.60% of those age 65 or over.

Government

County offices
The Texas Constitution requires that Jeff Davis and all other Texas counties, regardless of area or population, be governed by an elected five-member commissioners court. It exercises power and jurisdiction over all county business. The court is composed of the county judge as presiding officer, and four county commissioners elected to four-year terms from single-member precincts.

The county judge under the state's constitution is elected to a four-year term and is designated as a conservator of the peace. The judge need not be an attorney, but is constitutionally required to be well informed in the law of the state. The judge serves as the budget officer for the commissioners court, and with the assistance of the county clerk, prepares the annual budget proposal. In addition to presiding over meetings of the Commissioners Court, the County Judge officiates the County Court. The County Judge has jurisdiction over misdemeanor offenses in which the fine may exceed $500 or in which confinement or imprisonment may be imposed.

The current Jeff Davis county judge is Curtis Evans, a Republican.

The state constitution calls for the election of justices of the peace and constables from individual precincts. Because Jeff Davis County has a population of fewer than 18,000 persons, it is permitted to have a single county-wide precinct for the election of these offices. The justice court in criminal cases has original jurisdiction in matters punishable by a fine only. In civil matters, the court has exclusive jurisdiction in all disputes involving $200 or less.

The constable executes and returns processes, warrants, and precepts as directed, including eviction notices, and is expressly authorized to perform acts and services including the serving civil or criminal processes, citations, notices, warrants, subpoenas, and writs, and may do so anywhere within the county. Additionally, the constable may serve civil processes in all contiguous counties. The constable is also expected to attend sessions of the justice court.

The sheriff is elected to a four-year term. Because the county has a population of fewer than 10,000, the sheriff also serves as the assessor-collector of taxes. 
The county is served by Sheriff Rick McIvor, a Democrat first elected in 2008, and now serving his second term.

The county clerk holds a four-year elected term and serves as clerk to both commissioners court and county court, and acts as recorder for the county. Because Jeff Davis County has fewer than 8,000 residents, the county clerk also serves as the district clerk.

District offices
Jeff Davis County is within the 23rd congressional district; it is represented in the U.S. Congress by Rep. Tony Gonzales, a Republican.

The county is represented in the Texas Legislature by state Senator Cesar Blanco, a Democrat of the 29th senatorial district, and State Representative Eddie Morales, a Democrat of the 74th legislative district.

Martha M. Dominguez, a Democrat, represents the county from District 1 on the State Board of Education.

Politics

Education

Western Jeff Davis County is served by the Valentine Independent School District, while central and eastern Jeff Davis County are served by the Fort Davis Independent School District.

All of Jeff Davis County is zoned to Odessa College.

Communities
 Valentine
 Fort Davis (county seat)

In popular culture
The Mountain Goats recorded a song called "Jeff Davis County Blues" on the 2002 album All Hail West Texas.

See also

 List of museums in West Texas
 National Register of Historic Places listings in Jeff Davis County, Texas
 Recorded Texas Historic Landmarks in Jeff Davis County

References

External links

 Jeff Davis County Government
 
 "Jeff Davis County Profile" of the "Texas Association of Counties" 
 TXGenWeb Project for Jeff Davis
 Fort Davis Chamber of Commerce
 West Texas Weekly- a local weekly newspaper.

 
1887 establishments in Texas
Populated places established in 1887
Trans-Pecos